Robert Kromm (born 9 March 1984 in Schwerin) is a former German volleyball player.

Kromm, who last played for Germany in 2012, has 197 caps with the national team and could reach 200 during the Olympic Qualification tournament.
He was officially named the best volleyball player in Germany for 2016. With the German national team, Kromm participated in the 2008 Olympic Games and competed at the 2010 FIVB World Championship.

References 
 Profile

External links 
 
 

1984 births
Living people
German men's volleyball players
Sportspeople from Schwerin
Volleyball players at the 2008 Summer Olympics
Olympic volleyball players of Germany
Ural Ufa volleyball players
21st-century German people